Bobsleigh at the 2020 Winter Youth Olympics took place at the St. Moritz-Celerina Olympic Bobrun from 19 to 20 January 2020.

Medal summary

Medal table

Events

Qualification
A total of 36 bobsledders will qualify to compete (18 per gender). A NOC can enter a maximum of three athletes per gender. Quotas were officially awarded via the IBSF Youth World Ranking List as of December 9, 2019.

Summary

References

External links
Results Book – Bobsleigh

 
Youth Olympics
2020
2020 Winter Youth Olympics events
Youth Olympic